The Gualino Madonna is a painting attributed to Italian late medieval artist Duccio di Buoninsegna. It is housed in the Galleria Sabauda of Turin, northern Italy.

History
The provenance of the panel is unknown. In 1910 it was sold on the Florence antiquary market covered by a 16th-century repainting, which was removed in 1920. In 1925 it was acquired by the Turinese entrepreneur and collector Riccardo Gualino who, in 1930, gave it to the Galleria Sabauda. In 1933-1959 it was in London, after which it returned to the Turinese museum.

The work is not signed, and has been attributed, among the others, to Cimabue. Now it is unanimously assigned to Duccio, belonging to his early career, when he was influenced by Cimabue.

References

Sources

Paintings by Duccio
1280s paintings
Paintings of the Madonna and Child
Paintings in the Galleria Sabauda
Angels in art